Bangana sinkleri is a species of cyprinid fish endemic to the Chao Phraya River basin in Thailand.

References

Bangana
Fish described in 1934
Taxa named by Henry Weed Fowler